Charles Aznavour, also known as La bohème is an album by French-Armenian singer Charles Aznavour, released in 1966. It included such international hits as "La Bohème" and "Jezebel". The album includes songs by Charles Aznavour, Georges Garvarentz, Gilbert Bécaud and others. In 1966 it was originally released by Barclay Records in France and Canada, then by Reprise Records in the US (as Aznavour).

It was reissued in 1996 by EMI.

Track listing
La bohème (Charles Aznavour/Jacques Plante)
Aime-moi (Charles Aznavour/Jacques Plante)
Quelque chose ou quelqu'un (Charles Aznavour/Jacques Plante)
Ca vient sans qu'on y pense (Charles Aznavour/Jacques Plante)
Plus rien (Charles Aznavour/Georges Garvarentz)
II Viendra ce jour (Charles Aznavour)
Paris Au mois d'aout (Charles Aznavour/Georges Garvarentz)
Sur le chemin du retour (Charles Aznavour/Georges Garvarentz)
Il fallait bien (Charles Aznavour/Armand Seguian)
Parce que tu crois (Charles Aznavour)
La route (Charles Aznavour/Gilbert Bécaud)
Sarah (Charles Aznavour/Jacques Plante)
Je t'aime comme ca (Charles Aznavour/Jeff Davis)
Ay! mourir pur toi (Charles Aznavour)
L' amour a fleur de coeur (Charles Aznavour)
C'est merveilleux l'amour (Charles Aznavour/Gilbert Bécaud)
Jezebel (Charles Aznavour/Wayne Shanklin)
A propos de pommier (Charles Aznavour/Hubert Giraud)

Personnel
Charles Aznavour - author, composer, vocals
Georges Garvarentz - composer
Paul Mauriat - orchestration
Gilbert Bécaud - composer
Jeff Davis - composer
Gaveau - photography
Hubert Giraud - composer
André Gomet - photography
Nuite de Chine - design
Jacques Plante - lyricist
Lévon Sayan - art direction
Armand Seguian - composer
Wayne Shanklin - composer

References

External links
La boheme (live in 1965)

1966 albums
Charles Aznavour albums